Bapaume is a rural locality in the Southern Downs Region, Queensland, Australia.

History 
Bapaume takes its name from the Bapaume railway station, named by the Queensland Railways Department in 1920, after a World War I battlefield in France, involving the Australian Imperial Force. The area was opened as soldier settlements after 1919.

Bapaume Provisional School opened on 28 January 1925. In 1948 it became Bapaume State School. It closed on 10 December 1982.

References 

Southern Downs Region
Localities in Queensland